The 2003 Cleveland Indians season was the 103rd season for the franchise.  The 2003 Major League Baseball season began on March 30, 2003. The team finished fourth in the American League Central Division behind the Minnesota Twins, Chicago White Sox and Kansas City Royals

Offseason
December 6, 2002: Travis Hafner was traded by the Texas Rangers with Aaron Myette to the Cleveland Indians for Einar Díaz and Ryan Drese.
December 19, 2002: Jason Bere was signed as a free agent with the Cleveland Indians.
December 23, 2002: AJ Hinch was signed as a free agent with the Cleveland Indians.
January 14, 2003: Shane Spencer signed as a free agent with the Cleveland Indians.
March 29, 2003: AJ Hinch was purchased by the Detroit Tigers from the Cleveland Indians.

Regular season

Season standings

Record vs. opponents

Notable transactions
June 3, 2003: Kevin Kouzmanoff was drafted by the Cleveland Indians in the 6th round of the 2003 amateur draft. Player signed June 3, 2003.
July 18, 2003: Shane Spencer was traded by the Cleveland Indians with Ricardo Rodríguez to the Texas Rangers for Ryan Ludwick.

Roster

Game log

|- bgcolor="#ffbbbb"
| 26 || April 29 || Angels || 1–10 || Ortiz (4–2) || Rodríguez (2–2) || || Jacobs Field || 16,667 || 7–19 || L7
|- bgcolor="#ffbbbb"
| 27 || April 30 || Angels || 2–6 || Washburn (2–3) || Anderson (2–3) || || Jacobs Field || 15,761 || 7–20 || L8
|-

|- bgcolor="#ffbbbb"
| 31 || May 6 || @ Angels || 1–6 || Washburn (3–3) || Rodríguez (2–3) || || Edison International Field of Anaheim || 25,043 || 9–22 || L1
|- bgcolor="#ffbbbb"
| 32 || May 7 || @ Angels || 5–6 || Shields (2–1) || Elder (1–1) || Percival (4) || Edison International Field of Anaheim || 24,063 || 9–23 || L2
|- bgcolor="#ffbbbb"
| 33 || May 8 || @ Angels || 1–7 || Appier (2–2) || Davis (2–4) || || Edison International Field of Anaheim || 27,957 || 9–24 || L3
|-

|- bgcolor="#bbffbb"
| 59 || June 6 || @ Diamondbacks || 6–3 || Davis (5–4) || González (1–1) || Báez (12) || Bank One Ballpark || 32,430 || 24–35 || W1
|- bgcolor="#ffbbbb"
| 60 || June 7 || @ Diamondbacks || 3–5 || Randolph (1–0) || Anderson (3–6) || Valverde (2) || Bank One Ballpark || 36,619 || 24–36 || L1
|- bgcolor="#ffbbbb"
| 61 || June 8 || @ Diamondbacks || 3–13 || Webb (3–1) || Rodríguez (3–7) || || Bank One Ballpark || 42,956 || 24–37 || L2
|-

|- bgcolor="#ffbbbb"
| 115 || August 8 || Angels || 2–5 || Washburn (9–11) || Davis (7–9) || || Jacobs Field || 26,175 || 47–68 || L1
|- bgcolor="#bbffbb"
| 116 || August 9 || Angels || 3–2 (13) || Cressend (1–0) || Weber (2–1) || || Jacobs Field || 26,391 || 48–68 || W1
|- bgcolor="#bbffbb"
| 117 || August 9 || Angels || 3–2 || Boyd (3–1) || Shields (2–3) || Báez (25) || Jacobs Field || 20,116 || 49–68 || W2
|- bgcolor="#bbffbb"
| 118 || August 10 || Angels || 3–1 || Sabathia (10–7) || Lackey (7–11) || Betancourt (1) || Jacobs Field || 23,576 || 50–68 || W3
|-

|- style="text-align:center;"
| Legend:       = Win       = Loss       = PostponementBold = Indians team member

|-align="center" bgcolor="#ffbbbb"
| 1 || March 31 || @ Orioles || 6 – 5 (13) || Ryan (1-0) || Westbrook (0-1) || || 46,257 || 0-1
|-align="center" bgcolor="#bbffbb"
| 2 || April 2 || @ Orioles || 4 – 2 || Rodríguez (1-0) || Daal (0-1) || Báez (1) || 27,658 || 1-1
|-align="center" bgcolor="#bbffbb"
| 3 || April 3 || @ Orioles || 3 – 0 || Anderson (1-0) || Helling (0-1) || Báez (2) || 18,470 || 2-1
|-align="center" bgcolor="#ffbbbb"
| 4 || April 4 || @ Royals || 5 – 1 || George (1-0) || Davis (0-1) || || 15,241 || 2-2
|-align="center" bgcolor="#ffbbbb"
| 5 || April 5 || @ Royals || 3 – 1 || Hernández (2-0) || Sabathia (0-1) || MacDougal (3) || 19,912 || 2-3
|-align="center" bgcolor="#bbbbbb"
| -- || April 6 || @ Royals || colspan=6|Postponed (rain) Rescheduled for June 30
|-align="center" bgcolor="#ffbbbb"
| 6 || April 8 || White Sox || 5 – 3 (10) || Koch (1-0) || Paronto (0-1) || || 42,301 || 2-4
|-align="center" bgcolor="#bbffbb"
| 7 || April 9 || White Sox || 5 – 2 || Anderson (2-0) || Garland (0-1) || Báez (3) || 14,841 || 3-4
|-align="center" bgcolor="#ffbbbb"
| 8 || April 10 || White Sox || 7 – 2 || Buehrle (2-1) || Davis (0-2) || || 15,916 || 3-5
|-align="center" bgcolor="#ffbbbb"
| 9 || April 11 || Royals || 1 – 0 || Hernández (3-0) || Westbrook (0-2) || MacDougal (6) || 17,931 || 3-6
|-align="center" bgcolor="#ffbbbb"
| 10 || April 12 || Royals || 5 – 2 || George (2-0) || Sabathia (0-2) || Carrasco (1) || 18,168 || 3-7
|-align="center" bgcolor="#bbffbb"
| 11 || April 13 || Royals || 6 – 1 || Rodríguez (2-0) || May (0-1) || || 19,335 || 4-7
|-align="center" bgcolor="#ffbbbb"
| 12 || April 14 || Royals || 12 – 4 || Affeldt (2-0) || Anderson (2-1) || || 15,875 || 4-8
|-align="center" bgcolor="#bbffbb"
| 13 || April 15 || Orioles || 8 – 3 || Davis (1-2) || Daal (0-2) || || 17,015 || 5-8
|-align="center" bgcolor="#ffbbbb"
| 14 || April 16 || Orioles || 4 – 3 || Groom (1-0) || Báez (0-1) || Julio (2) || 15,674 || 5-9
|-align="center" bgcolor="#ffbbbb"
| 15 || April 17 || Orioles || 6 – 4 (12) || Roberts (1-1) || Paronto (0-2) || Julio (3) || 17,368 || 5-10
|-align="center" bgcolor="#ffbbbb"
| 16 || April 18 || @ White Sox || 5 – 3 || Colón (2-0) || Traber (0-1) || || 13,015 || 5-11
|-align="center" bgcolor="#ffbbbb"
| 17 || April 19 || @ White Sox || 12 – 3 || Stewart (1-1) || Anderson (2-2) || || 18,907 || 5-12
|-align="center" bgcolor="#bbffbb"
| 18 || April 20 || @ White Sox || 7 – 4 || Davis (2-2) || Buehrle (2-2) || || 14,975 || 6-12
|-align="center" bgcolor="#bbffbb"
| 19 || April 21 || @ White Sox || 9 – 2 || Westbrook (1-2) || Garland (0-2) || || 15,424 || 7-12
|-align="center" bgcolor="#ffbbbb"
| 20 || April 22 || @ Mariners || 8 – 5 || Carrara (1-0) || Báez (0-2) || || 25,231 || 7-13
|-align="center" bgcolor="#ffbbbb"
| 21 || April 23 || @ Mariners || 4 – 0 || Meche (2-1) || Rodríguez (2-1) || || 26,036 || 7-14
|-align="center" bgcolor="#ffbbbb"
| 22 || April 24 || @ Mariners || 4 – 2 || Moyer (3-1) || Traber (0-2) || Nelson (1) || 26,263 || 7-15
|-align="center" bgcolor="#ffbbbb"
| 23 || April 25 || @ Athletics || 5 – 2 || Lilly (2-0) || Davis (2-3) || Foulke (5) || 11,178 || 7-16
|-align="center" bgcolor="#ffbbbb"
| 24 || April 26 || @ Athletics || 6 – 3 || Bradford (2-2) || Mulholland (0-1) || Foulke (6) || 36,346 || 7-17
|-align="center" bgcolor="#ffbbbb"
| 25 || April 27 || @ Athletics || 4 – 3 || Rincón (2-1) || Báez (0-3) || || 26,414 || 7-18
|-align="center" bgcolor="#ffbbbb"
| 26 || April 29 || Angels || 10 – 1 || Ortiz (4-2) || Rodríguez (2-2) || || 16,667 || 7-19
|-align="center" bgcolor="#ffbbbb"
| 27 || April 30 || Angels || 6 – 2 || Washburn (2-3) || Anderson (2-3) || || 15,761 || 7-20
|-

|-align="center" bgcolor="#bbffbb"
| 28 || May 2 || Rangers || 6 – 5 || Elder (1-0) || Cordero (1-3) || Báez (4) || 19,823 || 8-20
|-align="center" bgcolor="#ffbbbb"
| 29 || May 3 || Rangers || 6 – 5 || Powell (1-0) || Santiago (0-1) || Urbina (9) || 23,030 || 8-21
|-align="center" bgcolor="#bbffbb"
| 30 || May 4 || Rangers || 3 – 1 || Sabathia (1-2) || Thomson (2-3) || Báez (5) || 20,866 || 9-21
|-align="center" bgcolor="#ffbbbb"
| 31 || May 6 || @ Angels || 6 – 1 || Washburn (3-3) || Rodríguez (2-3) || || 25,043 || 9-22
|-align="center" bgcolor="#ffbbbb"
| 32 || May 7 || @ Angels || 6 – 5 || Shields (2-1) || Elder (1-1) || Percival (4) || 24,063 || 9-23
|-align="center" bgcolor="#ffbbbb"
| 33 || May 8 || @ Angels || 7 – 1 || Appier (2-2) || Davis (2-4) || || 27,957 || 9-24
|-align="center" bgcolor="#bbffbb"
| 34 || May 9 || @ Rangers || 9 – 5 || Westbrook (2-2) || Thomson (2-4) || || 25,106 || 10-24
|-align="center" bgcolor="#bbffbb"
| 35 || May 10 || @ Rangers || 6 – 4 || Sabathia (2-2) || Benes (0-1) || Báez (6) || 43,484 || 11-24
|-align="center" bgcolor="#ffbbbb"
| 36 || May 11 || @ Rangers || 17 – 10 || Benoit (1-0) || Rodríguez (2-4) || || 23,407 || 11-25
|-align="center" bgcolor="#ffbbbb"
| 37 || May 13 || Mariners || 8 – 3 || Piñeiro (3-3) || Anderson (2-4) || || 16,721 || 11-26
|-align="center" bgcolor="#bbffbb"
| 38 || May 14 || Mariners || 7 – 2 || Davis (3-4) || García (3-5) || || 17,324 || 12-26
|-align="center" bgcolor="#ffbbbb"
| 39 || May 15 || Mariners || 9 – 1 || Carrara (2-0) || Westbrook (2-3) || || 17,889 || 12-27
|-align="center" bgcolor="#bbffbb"
| 40 || May 16 || Athletics || 3 – 2 || Traber (1-2) || Mulder (6-2) || Báez (7) || 22,357 || 13-27
|-align="center" bgcolor="#bbffbb"
| 41 || May 17 || Athletics || 4 – 2 || Mulholland (1-1) || Rincón (3-3) || Báez (8) || 23,958 || 14-27
|-align="center" bgcolor="#ffbbbb"
| 42 || May 18 || Athletics || 8 – 5 || Foulke (2-0) || Báez (0-4) || || 25,421 || 14-28
|-align="center" bgcolor="#bbffbb"
| 43 || May 19 || Tigers || 10 – 9 || Traber (2-2) || Walker (1-1) || Riske (1) || 16,492 || 15-28
|-align="center" bgcolor="#bbffbb"
| 44 || May 20 || Tigers || 6 – 4 || Riske (1-0) || Roney (0-1) || || 15,499 || 16-28
|-align="center" bgcolor="#bbffbb"
| 45 || May 21 || Tigers || 4 – 0 || Sabathia (3-2) || Bonderman (2-7) || || 16,534 || 17-28
|-align="center" bgcolor="#ffbbbb"
| 46 || May 22 || Tigers || 3 – 2 (11) || Germán (2-2) || Phillips (0-1) || Sparks (2) || 18,347 || 17-29
|-align="center" bgcolor="#ffbbbb"
| 47 || May 23 || @ Red Sox || 9 – 2 || Lowe (4-3) || Rodríguez (2-5) || || 32,673 || 17-30
|-align="center" bgcolor="#ffbbbb"
| 48 || May 24 || @ Red Sox || 12 – 3 || Burkett (3-2) || Anderson (2-5) || || 32,643 || 17-31
|-align="center" bgcolor="#bbffbb"
| 49 || May 25 || @ Red Sox || 6 – 4 || Davis (4-4) || Fossum (4-3) || Báez (9) || 34,318 || 18-31
|-align="center" bgcolor="#ffbbbb"
| 50 || May 26 || @ Tigers || 6 – 5 || Avery (2-0) || Boyd (0-1) || Germán (2) || 17,619 || 18-32
|-align="center" bgcolor="#bbffbb"
| 51 || May 27 || @ Tigers || 5 – 2 || Miceli (1-0) || Walker (1-2) || Báez (10) || 10,844 || 19-32
|-align="center" bgcolor="#bbffbb"
| 52 || May 28 || @ Tigers || 8 – 2 || Rodríguez (3-5) || Maroth (1-10) || || 17,388 || 20-32
|-align="center" bgcolor="#bbffbb"
| 53 || May 30 || White Sox || 7 – 3 || Sabathia (4-2) || Wright (0-3) || || 24,666 || 21-32
|-align="center" bgcolor="#bbbbbb"
| -- || May 31 || White Sox || colspan=6|Postponed (rain) Rescheduled for July 12
|-

|-align="center" bgcolor="#bbffbb"
| 54 || June 1 || White Sox || 5 – 4 (10) || Boyd (1-1) || Koch (1-2) || || 22,681 || 22-32
|-align="center" bgcolor="#bbffbb"
| 55 || June 2 || White Sox || 5 – 2 || Anderson (3-5) || Colón (5-5) || Báez (11) || 20,892 || 23-32
|-align="center" bgcolor="#ffbbbb"
| 56 || June 3 || @ Rockies || 7 – 3 || Elarton (2-1) || Rodríguez (3-6) || || 22,326 || 23-33
|-align="center" bgcolor="#ffbbbb"
| 57 || June 4 || @ Rockies || 2 – 1 || Oliver (3-4) || Traber (2-3) || Jiménez (13) || 22,222 || 23-34
|-align="center" bgcolor="#ffbbbb"
| 58 || June 5 || @ Rockies || 7 – 4 || Jennings (4-5) || Sabathia (4-3) || Jiménez (14) || 25,221 || 23-35
|-align="center" bgcolor="#bbffbb"
| 59 || June 6 || @ Diamondbacks || 6 – 3 || Davis (5-4) || González (1-1) || Báez (12) || 32,430 || 24-35
|-align="center" bgcolor="#ffbbbb"
| 60 || June 7 || @ Diamondbacks || 5 – 3 || Randolph (1-0) || Anderson (3-6) || Valverde (2) || 36,619 || 24-36
|-align="center" bgcolor="#ffbbbb"
| 61 || June 8 || @ Diamondbacks || 13 – 3 || Webb (3-1) || Rodríguez (3-7) || || 42,956 || 24-37
|-align="center" bgcolor="#bbffbb"
| 62 || June 10 || Padres || 8 – 5 || Westbrook (3-3) || Tollberg (0-2) || Báez (13) || 19,949 || 25-37
|-align="center" bgcolor="#bbffbb"
| 63 || June 11 || Padres || 3 – 2 || Sabathia (5-3) || Eaton (2-5) || Báez (14) || 17,427 || 26-37
|-align="center" bgcolor="#ffbbbb"
| 64 || June 12 || Padres || 9 – 4 || Peavy (5-5) || Davis (5-5) || || 17,983 || 26-38
|-align="center" bgcolor="#ffbbbb"
| 65 || June 13 || Dodgers || 4 – 3 (10) || Quantrill (1-2) || Westbrook (3-4) || Gagné (25) || 23,401 || 26-39
|-align="center" bgcolor="#ffbbbb"
| 66 || June 14 || Dodgers || 5 – 2 || Ashby (1-4) || Tallet (0-1) || || 25,426 || 26-40
|-align="center" bgcolor="#ffbbbb"
| 67 || June 15 || Dodgers || 4 – 3 || Nomo (7-6) || Traber (2-4) || Gagné (26) || 26,786 || 26-41
|-align="center" bgcolor="#bbffbb"
| 68 || June 17 || @ Tigers || 7 – 4 || Sabathia (6-3) || Bernero (1-9) || Báez (15) || 13,908 || 27-41
|-align="center" bgcolor="#bbffbb"
| 69 || June 18 || @ Tigers || 4 – 1 || Davis (6-5) || Bonderman (2-10) || || 16,278 || 28-41
|-align="center" bgcolor="#bbffbb"
| 70 || June 19 || @ Tigers || 10 – 3 || Anderson (4-6) || Cornejo (3-5) || || 19,098 || 29-41
|-align="center" bgcolor="#ffbbbb"
| 71 || June 20 || @ Pirates || 5 – 4 (15) || Torres (5-2) || Báez (0-5) || || 26,305 || 29-42
|-align="center" bgcolor="#ffbbbb"
| 72 || June 21 || @ Pirates || 7 – 6 (15) || Sauerbeck (2-4) || Miceli (1-1) || || 36,856 || 29-43
|-align="center" bgcolor="#bbffbb"
| 73 || June 22 || @ Pirates || 8 – 5 || Sabathia (7-3) || Vogelsong (0-1) || Báez (16) || 37,803 || 30-43
|-align="center" bgcolor="#ffbbbb"
| 74 || June 24 || Royals || 3 – 1 || George (9-4) || Davis (6-6) || MacDougal (17) || 19,638 || 30-44
|-align="center" bgcolor="#ffbbbb"
| 75 || June 25 || Royals || 3 – 1 (10) || Gilfillan (2-0) || Riske (1-1) || MacDougal (18) || 18,527 || 30-45
|-align="center" bgcolor="#ffbbbb"
| 76 || June 26 || Royals || 4 – 1 || Lima (2-0) || Rodríguez (3-8) || MacDougal (19) || 17,494 || 30-46
|-align="center" bgcolor="#bbffbb"
| 77 || June 27 || Reds || 3 – 0 || Traber (3-4) || Graves (3-7) || Báez (17) || 29,233 || 31-46
|-align="center" bgcolor="#ffbbbb"
| 78 || June 28 || Reds || 5 – 4 || Reitsma (7-2) || Báez (0-6) || Williamson (18) || 31,924 || 31-47
|-align="center" bgcolor="#bbffbb"
| 79 || June 29 || Reds || 3 – 1 || Davis (7-6) || Haynes (1-7) || Báez (18) || 28,433 || 32-47
|-align="center" bgcolor="#bbffbb"
| 80 || June 30 || @ Royals || 10 – 5 || Lee (1-0) || Voyles (0-1) || || || 33-47
|-align="center" bgcolor="#bbffbb"
| 81 || June 30 || @ Royals || 8 – 5 || Anderson (5-6) || Walrond (0-2) || Báez (19) || 14,645 || 34-47
|-

|-align="center" bgcolor="#ffbbbb"
| 82 || July 1 || @ Royals || 6 – 3 || Lima (3-0) || Rodríguez (3-9) || MacDougal (21) || 12,831 || 34-48
|-align="center" bgcolor="#ffbbbb"
| 83 || July 2 || @ Royals || 8 – 2 || May (2-4) || Traber (3-5) || || 12,918 || 34-49
|-align="center" bgcolor="#bbffbb"
| 84 || July 3 || @ Twins || 4 – 1 || Sabathia (8-3) || Rogers (7-4) || || 15,064 || 35-49
|-align="center" bgcolor="#ffbbbb"
| 85 || July 4 || @ Twins || 9 – 2 || Reed (4-8) || Davis (7-7) || || 21,328 || 35-50
|-align="center" bgcolor="#bbffbb"
| 86 || July 5 || @ Twins || 13 – 2 || Anderson (6-6) || Mays (8-6) || || 20,273 || 36-50
|-align="center" bgcolor="#bbffbb"
| 87 || July 6 || @ Twins || 5 – 3 (10) || Riske (2-1) || Guardado (1-4) || Báez (20) || 20,549 || 37-50
|-align="center" bgcolor="#bbffbb"
| 88 || July 8 || Yankees || 4 – 0 || Traber (4-5) || Weaver (4-7) || || 26,540 || 38-50
|-align="center" bgcolor="#ffbbbb"
| 89 || July 9 || Yankees || 6 – 2 || Wells (11-3) || Sabathia (8-4) || || 25,058 || 38-51
|-align="center" bgcolor="#bbffbb"
| 90 || July 10 || Yankees || 3 – 2 (10) || Boyd (2-1) || Hitchcock (0-2) || || 30,167 || 39-51
|-align="center" bgcolor="#bbffbb"
| 91 || July 11 || White Sox || 12 – 5 || Anderson (7-6) || Wright (0-4) || || 27,712 || 40-51
|-align="center" bgcolor="#ffbbbb"
| 92 || July 12 || White Sox || 7 – 4 (10) || Marte (3-1) || Mulholland (1-2) || Gordon (2) || 24,163 || 40-52
|-align="center" bgcolor="#bbffbb"
| 93 || July 12 || White Sox || 4 – 2 || Westbrook (4-4) || Porzio (0-1) || Báez (21) || 27,165 || 41-52
|-align="center" bgcolor="#ffbbbb"
| 94 || July 13 || White Sox || 7 – 4 || Marte (4-1) || Betancourt (0-1) || Gordon (3) || 26,467 || 41-53
|-align="center" bgcolor="#ffbbbb"
| 95 || July 17 || @ Yankees || 5 – 4 || Rivera (4-0) || Riske (2-2) || || 46,401 || 41-54
|-align="center" bgcolor="#ffbbbb"
| 96 || July 18 || @ Yankees || 10 – 4 || Clemens (9-6) || Anderson (7-7) || || 47,341 || 41-55
|-align="center" bgcolor="#ffbbbb"
| 97 || July 19 || @ Yankees || 7 – 4 || Wells (12-3) || Sabathia (8-5) || Rivera (17) || 54,981 || 41-56
|-align="center" bgcolor="#ffbbbb"
| 98 || July 20 || @ Yankees || 7 – 4 || Mussina (11-6) || Westbrook (4-5) || Rivera (18) || 51,891 || 41-57
|-align="center" bgcolor="#ffbbbb"
| 99 || July 21 || @ White Sox || 4 – 3 || Porzio (1-1) || Tallet (0-2) || Gordon (5) || 31,776 || 41-58
|-align="center" bgcolor="#ffbbbb"
| 100 || July 22 || @ White Sox || 5 – 2 || Colón (7-9) || Davis (7-8) || Marte (6) || 20,667 || 41-59
|-align="center" bgcolor="#bbffbb"
| 101 || July 23 || Tigers || 4 – 1 || Anderson (8-7) || Roney (1-5) || Báez (22) || 21,202 || 42-59
|-align="center" bgcolor="#ffbbbb"
| 102 || July 24 || Tigers || 7 – 4 || Cornejo (5-8) || Sabathia (8-6) || Mears (3) || 20,857 || 42-60
|-align="center" bgcolor="#ffbbbb"
| 103 || July 25 || Twins || 6 – 5 || Hawkins (8-2) || Báez (0-7) || Guardado (24) || 23,444 || 42-61
|-align="center" bgcolor="#bbffbb"
| 104 || July 26 || Twins || 9 – 2 || Traber (5-5) || Lohse (6-9) || || 25,077 || 43-61
|-align="center" bgcolor="#bbffbb"
| 105 || July 27 || Twins || 3 – 2 (14) || Betancourt (1-1) || Rincón (2-4) || || 24,318 || 44-61
|-align="center" bgcolor="#ffbbbb"
| 106 || July 29 || @ Athletics || 6 – 2 || Mulder (14-7) || Anderson (8-8) || Foulke (27) || 19,260 || 44-62
|-align="center" bgcolor="#bbffbb"
| 107 || July 30 || @ Athletics || 4 – 2 || Sabathia (9-6) || Lilly (6-9) || Báez (23) || 29,792 || 45-62
|-align="center" bgcolor="#ffbbbb"
| 108 || July 31 || @ Athletics || 3 – 1 || Harden (2-0) || Westbrook (4-6) || Foulke (28) || 25,011 || 45-63
|-

|-align="center" bgcolor="#ffbbbb"
| 109 || August 1 || @ Rangers || 10 – 3 || Thomson (9-10) || Traber (5-6) || || 24,143 || 45-64
|-align="center" bgcolor="#ffbbbb"
| 110 || August 2 || @ Rangers || 9 – 7 || Ramirez (3-0) || Stanford (0-1) || Cordero (4) || 49,290 || 45-65
|-align="center" bgcolor="#ffbbbb"
| 111 || August 3 || @ Rangers || 8 – 5 || Dickey (5-5) || Anderson (8-9) || Cordero (5) || 19,133 || 45-66
|-align="center" bgcolor="#ffbbbb"
| 112 || August 5 || Mariners || 2 – 1 || Moyer (15-5) || Sabathia (9-7) || Hasegawa (8) || 22,300 || 45-67
|-align="center" bgcolor="#bbffbb"
| 113 || August 6 || Mariners || 10 – 6 || Westbrook (5-6) || Piñeiro (13-6) || || 23,282 || 46-67
|-align="center" bgcolor="#bbffbb"
| 114 || August 7 || Mariners || 3 – 0 || Traber (6-6) || García (9-12) || Báez (24) || 21,141 || 47-67
|-align="center" bgcolor="#ffbbbb"
| 115 || August 8 || Angels || 5 – 2 || Washburn (9-11) || Davis (7-9) || || 26,175 || 47-68
|-align="center" bgcolor="#bbffbb"
| 116 || August 9 || Angels || 3 – 2 (13) || Cressend (1-0) || Weber (2-1) || || 26,391 || 48-68
|-align="center" bgcolor="#bbffbb"
| 117 || August 9 || Angels || 3 – 2 || Boyd (3-1) || Shields (2-3) || Báez (25) || 20,116 || 49-68
|-align="center" bgcolor="#bbffbb"
| 118 || August 10 || Angels || 3 – 1 || Sabathia (10-7) || Lackey (7-11) || Betancourt (1) || 23,576 || 50-68
|-align="center" bgcolor="#ffbbbb"
| 119 || August 11 || @ Twins || 5 – 3 || Lohse (9-9) || Westbrook (5-7) || Hawkins (1) || 23,291 || 50-69
|-align="center" bgcolor="#bbffbb"
| 120 || August 12 || @ Twins || 9 – 6 || Betancourt (2-1) || Baldwin (0-1) || || 25,834 || 51-69
|-align="center" bgcolor="#bbffbb"
| 121 || August 13 || @ Twins || 5 – 0 (14) || Mulholland (2-2) || Rincón (3-5) || || 30,082 || 52-69
|-align="center" bgcolor="#bbffbb"
| 122 || August 14 || @ Twins || 8 – 3 || Anderson (9-9) || Radke (8-10) || || 24,273 || 53-69
|-align="center" bgcolor="#bbffbb"
| 123 || August 15 || Devil Rays || 1 – 0 || Sabathia (11-7) || Harper (2-7) || || 19,679 || 54-69
|-align="center" bgcolor="#ffbbbb"
| 124 || August 16 || Devil Rays || 5 – 3 || Malaska (2-1) || Lee (1-1) || Carter (21) || 23,397 || 54-70
|-align="center" bgcolor="#bbffbb"
| 125 || August 17 || Devil Rays || 5 – 4 (12) || Mulholland (3-2) || Colomé (3-6) || || 21,097 || 55-70
|-align="center" bgcolor="#ffbbbb"
| 126 || August 18 || Devil Rays || 7 – 4 (13) || Carter (7-3) || Mulholland (3-3) || || 18,685 || 55-71
|-align="center" bgcolor="#ffbbbb"
| 127 || August 19 || Twins || 8 – 2 || Santana (7-3) || Davis (7-10) || || 21,239 || 55-72
|-align="center" bgcolor="#ffbbbb"
| 128 || August 20 || Twins || 4 – 3 || Radke (9-10) || Anderson (9-10) || Guardado (28) || 20,197 || 55-73
|-align="center" bgcolor="#bbffbb"
| 129 || August 22 || @ Devil Rays || 8 – 3 || Lee (2-1) || Kennedy (3-10) || || 11,979 || 56-73
|-align="center" bgcolor="#bbffbb"
| 130 || August 23 || @ Devil Rays || 7 – 5 || Sabathia (12-7) || Backe (1-1) || Riske (2) || 18,805 || 57-73
|-align="center" bgcolor="#bbffbb"
| 131 || August 24 || @ Devil Rays || 7 – 5 || Westbrook (6-7) || González (6-6) || Riske (3) || 14,507 || 58-73
|-align="center" bgcolor="#ffbbbb"
| 132 || August 26 || Tigers || 5 – 4 || Cornejo (6-13) || Traber (6-7) || Walker (3) || 16,972 || 58-74
|-align="center" bgcolor="#bbffbb"
| 133 || August 27 || Tigers || 9 – 7 || Cressend (2-0) || Spurling (1-3) || Riske (4) || 16,457 || 59-74
|-align="center" bgcolor="#bbffbb"
| 134 || August 28 || Tigers || 8 – 3 || Lee (3-1) || Bonderman (6-18) || || 16,282 || 60-74
|-align="center" bgcolor="#ffbbbb"
| 135 || August 29 || Blue Jays || 7 – 3 || Escobar (10-8) || Sabathia (12-8) || || 21,008 || 60-75
|-align="center" bgcolor="#ffbbbb"
| 136 || August 30 || Blue Jays || 9 – 3 || Lidle (12-11) || Westbrook (6-8) || Towers (1) || 21,806 || 60-76
|-align="center" bgcolor="#bbffbb"
| 137 || August 31 || Blue Jays || 5 – 4 || Báez (1-7) || Kershner (0-3) || || 20,866 || 61-76
|-

|-align="center" bgcolor="#bbffbb"
| 138 || September 1 || @ Tigers || 7 – 4 || Santiago (1-1) || Walker (3-3) || Riske (5) || 10,986 || 62-76
|-align="center" bgcolor="#ffbbbb"
| 139 || September 2 || @ Tigers || 8 – 6 || Schmack (1-0) || Durbin (0-1) || Rodney (1) || 9,318 || 62-77
|-align="center" bgcolor="#ffbbbb"
| 140 || September 3 || @ Tigers || 6 – 5 (11) || Walker (4-3) || Santiago (1-2) || || 10,234 || 62-78
|-align="center" bgcolor="#ffbbbb"
| 141 || September 4 || @ Tigers || 2 – 1 || Knotts (3-5) || Westbrook (6-9) || Patterson (3) || 11,371 || 62-79
|-align="center" bgcolor="#ffbbbb"
| 142 || September 5 || @ White Sox || 5 – 3 || Garland (11-10) || Traber (6-8) || Gordon (9) || 27,196 || 62-80
|-align="center" bgcolor="#ffbbbb"
| 143 || September 6 || @ White Sox || 8 – 5 || Loaiza (19-6) || Cressend (2-1) || Gordon (10) || 24,796 || 62-81
|-align="center" bgcolor="#ffbbbb"
| 144 || September 7 || @ White Sox || 7 – 3 || Schoeneweis (3-2) || Báez (1-8) || || 19,999 || 62-82
|-align="center" bgcolor="#bbffbb"
| 145 || September 9 || @ Royals || 7 – 1 || Davis (8-10) || Gobble (3-4) || || 12,389 || 63-82
|-align="center" bgcolor="#ffbbbb"
| 146 || September 10 || @ Royals || 9 – 7 || Wilson (6-3) || Santiago (1-3) ||  Affeldt (4) || 21,581 || 63-83
|-align="center" bgcolor="#bbffbb"
| 147 || September 11 || @ Royals || 6 – 5 || Báez (2-8) || Grimsley (2-6) || Riske (6) || 13,188 || 64-83
|-align="center" bgcolor="#bbffbb"
| 148 || September 12 || Twins || 4 – 3 || Sabathia (13-8) || Rogers (11-8) || Riske (7) || 20,679 || 65-83
|-align="center" bgcolor="#ffbbbb"
| 149 || September 13 || Twins || 2 – 0 || Lohse (13-11) || Stanford (0-2) || Guardado (35) || 20,440 || 65-84
|-align="center" bgcolor="#ffbbbb"
| 150 || September 14 || Twins || 5 – 3 || Rincón (5-6) || Báez (2-9) || Guardado (36) || 19,452 || 65-85
|-align="center" bgcolor="#ffbbbb"
| 151 || September 15 || Twins || 13 – 6 || Santana (11-3) || Davis (8-11) || || 16,967 || 65-86
|-align="center" bgcolor="#ffbbbb"
| 152 || September 16 || Royals || 12 – 8 || May (9-7) || Traber (6-9) || || 16,145 || 65-87
|-align="center" bgcolor="#bbffbb"
| 153 || September 17 || Royals || 9 – 1 || Westbrook (7-9) || Abbott (1-2) || || 16,363 || 66-87
|-align="center" bgcolor="#ffbbbb"
| 154 || September 18 || Royals || 3 – 2 || Lima (8-1) || Sabathia (13-9) || Leskanic (2) || 17,275 || 66-88
|-align="center" bgcolor="#ffbbbb"
| 155 || September 19 || Red Sox || 2 – 0 || Burkett (11-8) || Stanford (0-3) || Embree (1) || 20,374 || 66-89
|-align="center" bgcolor="#bbffbb"
| 156 || September 20 || Red Sox || 13 – 4 || Lee (1-0) || Lowe (16-7) || || 23,242 || 67-89
|-align="center" bgcolor="#ffbbbb"
| 157 || September 21 || Red Sox || 2 – 0 || Martínez (14-4) || Lee (3-2) || Kim (15) || 27,655 || 67-90
|-align="center" bgcolor="#ffbbbb"
| 158 || September 23 || @ Twins || 4 – 1 || Rogers (13-8) || Westbrook (7-10) || Guardado (40) || 33,650 || 67-91
|-align="center" bgcolor="#ffbbbb"
| 159 || September 24 || @ Twins || 3 – 2 || Orosco (1-0) || Betancourt (2-2) || Guardado (41) || 32,986 || 67-92
|-align="center" bgcolor="#bbffbb"
| 160 || September 26 || @ Blue Jays || 2 – 1 || Stanford (1-3) || Lidle (12-15) || Riske (8) || 13,861 || 68-92
|-align="center" bgcolor="#ffbbbb"
| 161 || September 27 || @ Blue Jays || 5 – 4 || Halladay (22-7) || Mulholland (3-4) || || 21,504 || 68-93
|-align="center" bgcolor="#ffbbbb"
| 162 || September 28 || @ Blue Jays || 6 – 2 || Towers  (8-1) || Lee (3-3) || || 22,014 || 68-94
|-

Player stats

Batting

Starters by position
Note: Pos = Position; G = Games played; AB = At bats; R = Runs scored; H = Hits; 2B = Doubles; 3B = Triples; HR = Home runs; RBI = Runs batted in; AVG = Batting average; SB = Stolen bases

Other batters
Note: G = Games played; AB = At bats; R = Runs scored; H = Hits; 2B = Doubles; 3B = Triples; HR = Home runs; RBI = Runs batted in; AVG = Batting average; SB = Stolen bases

Note: Pitchers' hitting stats are not included above.

Pitching

Starting pitchers
Note: W = Wins; L = Losses; ERA = Earned run average; G = Games pitched; GS = Games started; IP = Innings pitched; H = Hits allowed; BB = Walks allowed; K = Strikeouts

Other pitchers
Note: W = Wins; L = Losses; ERA = Earned run average; G = Games pitched; GS = Games started; SV = Saves; IP = Innings pitched; H = Hits allowed; BB = Walks allowed; K = Strikeouts

Relief pitchers
Note: W = Wins; L = Losses; ERA = Earned run average; G = Games pitched; SV = Saves; IP = Innings pitched; H = Hits allowed; BB = Walks allowed; K = Strikeouts

Awards and honors

All-Star Game
 C. C. Sabathia, pitcher, reserve

Minor league affiliates

Notes

References
2003 Cleveland Indians at Baseball Reference
2003 Cleveland Indians at Baseball Almanac

Cleveland Guardians seasons
Cleveland Indians season
Cleve